Wright Peninsula is a peninsula on the east coast of Adelaide Island, Antarctica, lying between Stonehouse Bay to the north and Ryder Bay to the south. On its northern coastline the peninsula is fringed by the Stokes Peaks; on its southern side by the Reptile Ridge. The Princess Royal Range separates the peninsula from the rest of Adelaide Island; the only 'gap' is provided by McCallum Pass.

Its eastern coastline on Laubeuf Fjord is formed by the Wormald Ice Piedmont, whose vertical ice cliffs are broken in only two places to provide for ice-free landing sites. One of these is at Rothera Point at the southern tip of the peninsula, where the British Rothera Research Station is situated. The other is at tiny Mackay Point. Just off the piedmont is Webb Island.

Both the peninsula and the ice piedmont were surveyed by the Falkland Islands Dependencies Survey (FIDS) in 1961–62, and by the British Antarctic Survey (BAS) from 1976. Since 1985, there is a small specially protected area at Rothera Point of 0.1 km2.

Prior to 1964, the peninsula was called "Square Peninsula" for its somewhat rectangular shape. It was re-named by the United Kingdom Antarctic Place-Names Committee (UK-APC) in 1964 for British Antarctic Survey surveyor Alan F. Wright. The piedmont was named by UK-APC in 1977 after Steven Wormald, a prominent former BAS staff member.

References

Peninsulas of Graham Land
Landforms of Adelaide Island